2-4 Trinity Avenue, Dawes Point is a heritage-listed residence at 2-4 Trinity Avenue, in the inner city Sydney suburb of Dawes Point in the City of Sydney local government area of New South Wales, Australia. It was designed by the NSW Government Architect. The property was added to the New South Wales State Heritage Register on 2 April 1999.

History 
Millers Point is one of the earliest areas of European settlement in Australia, and a focus for maritime activities. This block of apartments is one of a group built as part of the post-plague redevelopment of the area. First tenanted by the NSW Department of Housing in 1982.

Description 
The two-bedroom unit in a block of three storey face brick  apartments with restrained detailing. Storeys: three Construction: Face brick, corrugated iron roof and timber bracketed sun hoods. Cast iron balconies. Painted timber windows. Style: Federation Arts and Crafts.

Externally, the unit is in good condition.

Modifications and dates 
External: Shutters altered. Joinery modified.

Heritage listing 
As at 23 November 2000, 2-4 Trinity Avenue, Millers Point is one of a group of three storey apartment blocks built  which is a fine example of post-plague workers' housing.

It is part of the Millers Point Conservation Area, an intact residential and maritime precinct. It contains residential buildings and civic spaces dating from the 1830s and is an important example of 19th century adaptation of the landscape.

2-4 Trinity Avenue, Millers Point was listed on the New South Wales State Heritage Register on 2 April 1999.

See also 

Australian residential architectural styles
30-42 Lower Fort Street

References

Attribution

External links

 

New South Wales State Heritage Register sites located in Millers Point
Houses in Millers Point, New South Wales
Articles incorporating text from the New South Wales State Heritage Register
1910 establishments in Australia
Houses completed in 1910
Millers Point Conservation Area